Rape This Day is a single by the American musical group Tomahawk. It appears on their 2003 record Mit Gas.

Music
Daphne Carr of Allmusic compared the song's sound to the Foo Fighters. Pitchfork's Scott Hreha described the song as having a "Herculean punk-rock chorus".

Track List

References

2003 singles
Ipecac Recordings singles
Tomahawk (band) songs
2003 songs
Songs written by Mike Patton